Lazica may refer to:

Lazica, an ancient Georgian region and kingdom
Lazica (planned city), a future urban development in Georgia
Lazika, a tracked infantry fighting vehicle developed by Georgia